James Dana (November 8, 1811 – June 4, 1890) was a Massachusetts politician who was the fifth mayor of  Charlestown, Massachusetts, USA.

Early life
Dana was born in Charlestown to Samuel and Rebecca (née Barrett) Dana.

Education
Dana was educated at Lawrence Academy, in Groton, Massachusetts, and graduated from Harvard College in the class of 1830.

Sources

1811 births
1890 deaths
Mayors of Charlestown, Massachusetts
Harvard College alumni
19th-century American politicians